The Indian Institute of Architects (IIA) is the national body of Architects in India with more than 1,24,000 members. It was established in 1917 with its headquarters in Mumbai, India. It is associated with the International Union of Architects (UIA) Commonwealth Association of Architects (CAA) and South Asian Association for Regional Cooperation of Architects (SAARCH).

History
On May 12, 1917, George Wittet, by then Consulting Architect to the Government of Bombay, was unanimously elected as the first President of The Indian Institute of Architects, an association made of the past students of Architecture of Sir J.J. School of Art, then known as "The Architectural Students Association". On 3 August 1922, it was rechristened 'Bombay Architectural Association', which got associated with the Royal Institute of British Architects in 1925, and in 1926 became a National body under a new name, 'Indian Institute of Architects' on 2 September 1929, registered under the Societies Registration Act XXI of 1860 as a voluntary organisation of Architects. The only other organisation at the national level is the Council of Architecture established under the Architects Act 1972 with the statutory duty of Registration.

The Northern Chapter of the institute was started in 1956. Today it has Chapters in numerous states and further centers in major cities, within those states

Overview
The institute conducts a professional examination in four parts. Students qualifying all the parts are awarded associate membership, which is a recognized qualification to work as an architect. It provides courses in architecture, town planning, and human settlement development. To join Indian Institute of Architects  there are three type of Memberships 1.Fellow (Any person qualified under Bye-Law 4 (a) and desirous of becoming a Fellow) 2. Associate (Any person qualified under Bye-Law 4 (b) and desirous of becoming an Associates) 3. Direct Fellow. So if any person qualified then they can apply on Indian Institute of Architects official website.

Chapters
 IIA, Andhra Pradesh Chapter
 Northern Chapter, (IIA)
 West Bengal Chapter, (IIA)
 Kerala Chapter, (IIA)
 IIA - Chandigarh-Punjab Chapter
 IIA - Haryana Chapter
 Solapur-Maharashtra Chapter
 IIA Odisha Chapter
 IIA Assam Chapter
 IIA UTTARAKHAND CHAPTER
IIA Chhattisgarh Chaper

References

External links 

 
 Council of Architecture

Architecture-related professional associations
Architecture in India
Commonwealth Association of Architects
Professional associations based in India
Organizations established in 1917